Pierre Carbonnier,  (7 August 1828 – 8 April 1883)  was a French  scientist, ichthyologist, fish breeder and public Aquarium director. Member of Imperial Society of acclimatization (Société Impériale d'Acclimatation).

Biography 
Pierre Carbonnier was born 7 August 1828 in Bergerac, son to Pierre and Marie Andrieu. As third child of twelve, he married Zélie Joséphine Flusin (dead 9 April 1883) in Paris November 10, 1857.

Pierre Carbonnier founded in 1850, one of the oldest public Aquaria in Paris.

In 1869 he started to breed exotic aquarium fishes, being the first in Europe to breed a tropical fish species, the Macropod (Paradise fish). This first shipment of tropical fish species was brought to Europe by a naval officer named Gerold (Gérault) at the request of French Consul (1868-1869) Eugene Simon (Eugène Simon) in Ningbo of Zhejiang Province in the southeast of China. Of 100 macropods, 22 arrived alive July 8, 1869 in Paris, and Carbonniers share of the shipment was 17 specimens, (12 males and 5 females). Two years later he had raised 200 specimens of the Paradise fish.

The same year he wrote the brochure "Report and observations about the pairing of one kind of Chinese fish" (fr. Rapport et Observations sur l'accouplement d'une espèce de poisson de Chine; 1869), "The new remark on the Chinese fish belonging to the genus makropody" (fr. Nouvelle Note sur un poisson de Chine appartenant au genre macropode; 1870), and others. He published also several works devoted to the breeding of crustaceans.

His fish breeding center was destroyed in 1870-1871 during the siege of Paris by the Prussian troops in the Franco-Prussian War, but he regained his spirit and in 1872 he introduced the Fantail, a variety of gold fish (Carassius auratus), in France.

In 1874 Carbonnier imported the first Siamese fighting fish  (Betta splendens) and Dwarf gourami (Colisa lalia).

At the International Exhibition of sea and river industries in Paris in 1875, Carbonnier was awarded the Gold Medal of the French Imperial Society of acclimatization for research and breeding of freshwater aquarium of exotic fish and his success of introducing exotic fish species to France.

In 1878 Carbonnier was the first to breed the Peppered corydoras catfish (Corydoras paleatus), native to the basin of the Paraná River in Brazil.

In the same year, Pierre Carbonnier was appointed director of the Trocadéro Aquarium at the French Exhibition of 1878 in Jardins du Trocadéro.

He died 1883 in Paris.

Publications 

 Pierre Carbonnier, Guide pratique du pisciculteur, Librairie scientifique, industrielle et agricole, Eugène Lacroix, Éditeur, Paris, 1864.
 Pierre Carbonnier, "Nidification du Poisson arc-en-ciel de l'Inde", in Bulletin de la Société d'Acclimatation, 3ème Série, Tome III, 1876, p.11-22.
 1864	Guide pratique du pisciculteur
 1867	Étude sur les causes de la mortalité des poissons
 1869	L'Écrevisse, mœurs, reproduction, éducation
 1869	Rapport et Observations sur l'accouplement d'une espèce de poisson de Chine
 1870	Nouvelle Note sur un poisson de Chine appartenant au genre macropode
 1872	Du Transport des poissons
 1872	Trois mémoires pour servir à l'histoire zoologique du poisson de Chine le macropode
 1872	Le Macropode de Chine
 1873	Commission des cheptels. Instruction aux chepteliers. 3e section. Poissons. Instructions sur les pratiques de l'incubation artificielle. Le transport des œufs et de l'alevin,  
 1873	De l'Influence de la pression extérieure sur la vie des poissons, et de la lumière lunaire sur la végétation aquatique
 1874	Mémoire sur la reproduction du poisson américain Le Fondule ([Fundula cyprinodonta] Cuv.) Mensuel de la Soc. D'acclimatation de Paris, d Bull. 3 (1) :665-671
 1875	Découverte d’une station préhistorique dans le département de la Seine  à Champigny (bulletin de la société académique de Brest)
 1876	Nidification du poisson arc-en-ciel de l'Inde
 1877	Le Gourami et son nid
 1879	Rapport et observations sur l'aquarium d'eau douce du Trocadéro
 1880	Sur le [Callichthys fasciatus] Cuvier. Bull. de la Soc. Zool. De France 5:288-290.

References

1828 births
1883 deaths
French ichthyologists
People from Bergerac, Dordogne